The Dean of Leicester is the head (primus inter pares – first among equals) and chair of the chapter of canons, the ruling body of Leicester Cathedral. The dean and chapter are based at the Cathedral Church of Saint Martin in Leicester. Before 2000 the post was designated as a provost, which was then the equivalent of a dean at most English cathedrals. The cathedral is the mother church of the Diocese of Leicester and seat of the Bishop of Leicester. The most recent Dean was David Monteith until he was installed as Dean of Canterbury on 17 December 2022.

List of deans

Provosts
1927–1934 Frederick MacNutt (also Archdeacon of Leicester, 1921–1938)
1938–1954 Herbert Jones (afterwards Dean of Manchester, 1954)
1954–1958 Mervyn Armstrong (afterwards Bishop of Jarrow, 1958)
1958–1963 Richard Mayston
1963–1978 John Hughes
1978–1992 Alan Warren
1992–1999 Derek Hole
2000–2002 Viv Faull (became Dean)

Deans
2002–2012 Viv Faull
2012-2013 Barry Naylor (Acting Dean)
2013–2022 David Monteith

References

Deans of Leicester
Deans of Leicester
 
Deans of Leicester
Dean
Diocese of Leicester